Sir John Deane's Sixth Form College is a sixth form college in Northwich, Cheshire, UK. It was formerly Sir John Deane's Grammar School, which was founded in 1557.

History

Sir John Deane (in the 16th century, the title indicated a presbyter with a university degree, rather than a knight; in today's language, he would be the Rev'd John Deane, MA) was born in Shurlach, between Davenham and the Rudheath district of Northwich, but rose to become Rector of Great St Bartholomew in Smithfield, London, and Prebendary of Lincoln. He worked under both Protestant and Roman Catholic régimes during the English Reformation.

He established a grammar school for poor boys in Witton on Michaelmas 1557, "in the name of Jesus". It was to be maintained by feoffees (a kind of charity), who were given land in Chester and the Wirral, the result of Sir John's astuteness during the dissolution of the monasteries. As well as prescribing rules for the Feofees, Schoolmaster and schoolboys, the foundation statues record his interest in an old Cheshire custom whereby schoolboys "a weeke before Christynmas and Easter, barre and keep forth of the Schoole the schoolmaster, in such sort is other schollers doe in greete schooles." Sir John required his Grammar School to enforce the custom and allow the boys to play with bows and arrows, "to the end that the  have not any evil opinion of the Schoolmaster." It was generally known as Witton Grammar School, or Witton Free Grammar School, in the early centuries. It had a close relationship with St Helen's Witton, and its early buildings were on the same site. The school had a reputation as hotbed of Puritanism in the early 17th century, and this is still perhaps its greatest contribution to public life. However, it fell into decline and became the smallest of the four ancient grammar schools of Cheshire. During the early 19th century, the feoffees and the headmaster began legal action in a dispute over the headmaster's salary, and eventually wider mismanagement. The case went to the Court of Chancery and took decades to resolve, sapping much of the school's strength.

In the early 20th century, three financial decisions radically changed the character of the school, by then generally referred to as Sir John Deane's Grammar School or Northwich Grammar School. Firstly, it received a generous 350th-anniversary benefaction from Sir John Brunner, allowing the governors to construct new buildings on its current riverside site. Secondly, the feoffees made poor investment decisions, culminating in the sale of property in Chester, that later became a high-value shopping district. Thirdly, they decided that in view of the school's long-term financial weakness, the original mandate was best fulfilled by entering the state system. The school came under the auspices of Cheshire County Council as the boys' grammar school for the Northwich area. For some time it continued to have boarders in Riversdale (an old house), which also functioned at times as the headmaster's house. This phase ended in 1977, when RoSLA and the County Council's policy of comprehensive education saw Northwich move from selective, single-sex 11–18 schools to comprehensive mixed 11–16 schools with Sir John Deane's becoming the town's sixth form college.

Echoes of the college's history remain today. Sir John Deane is commemorated in an annual founder's day service at St Helen's, usually in October. A large portrait of Sir John Brunner hangs in the college canteen. There are also subtler signs, such as the fine original buildings, the presence of a flourishing boat club in a state school, and the distinctive college arms.

Present day

Sir John Deane's College re-established itself as a voluntary controlled sixth form college in September 1978. It is a single site campus, parallel to the River Weaver; the college is around half a mile away from Northwich town centre, in the unitary authority of Cheshire West and Chester.  The college provides various qualifications. The college's main aim is to provide advanced level courses for full-time students aged between 16 to 18.  In 1998, the college introduced its part-time adult courses.  This initiative has seen high interest in recent years with more than 1,600 adults taking part in courses during the 2002/2003 academic year.

In the last Ofsted inspection, the inspectors gave the college's quality of provision outstanding in all of the curriculum areas inspected. The inspectors also noted that the college's overall retention and pass rates are very high and are significantly above the national averages for other sixth form colleges.

The college underwent a £28 million demolition and extension programme. The new college was finished in late 2010 and fully opened in early 2011, with each department having its own area in the new building with the original building being used as a new canteen and student services.

The college also has leisure facilities, including an outdoor astroturf pitch, football and rugby pitches, tennis courts, a sports hall and a swimming pool.

Admissions policy

The college has Partner High schools, namely: Rudheath Senior Academy, Middlewich High School, Weaverham High School, Hartford High School, County High School Leftwich. These schools do not have their own sixth forms. Students applying from these schools usually receive conditional offers based on their GCSE results, often requiring 2 B's and 4 C's. Details of entry requirements will be discussed with Partner High school students when senior staff from the college visit their schools in the Autumn Term of their Year 11.

The college allows applications from students attending other schools in Cheshire and beyond, and each year more than nine hundred such applications are received. Before 2006, the college dealt with applications in the order in which they were received. The college reserves the right to close its lists when numbers reach a certain limit, and that after that time, applications will only be accepted provisionally until final numbers are known in September. This practice is reviewed annually. All students will be advised in the course of their application interview on entry requirements, but as a general guide, should obtain six or more GCSE subjects at grade C and above, with at least two at grade B, or if from a non-partner high school four B grades and two C grades should be achieved.

The college would normally expect students to achieve Grade Bs in each of the subjects to be studied at A-Level, or in a related subject.

There is an online application system that allows students to apply to the college via its website.

Old Wittonians and former schoolmasters

Old boys of the Grammar School are referred to as 'Old Wittonians', also the name of the school magazine, and this is used for old members of the College. Notable men linked associated with the school (Old Wittonians unless noted) include:
 Sir John Berkenhead, Cavalier journalist, poet and politician
 Sir George Cory, 19th/20th-century chemist and historian, taught at the school some time between 1884 and 1886.
 Martin Edwards, crime novelist
 Peter Gammond, music critic, writer, poet, and artist
 John Greenway MP, 20th/21st-century Conservative politician for Ryedale
 Edwin Haslam, author
 Eaton Hodgkinson, a 19th-century engineer, had a brief and unhappy time at the school
 Philip Holland, 20th-century Conservative politician
 Charles James Hughes JP, pioneer of Association Football, co-founder of Northwich Victoria F.C., FA Cup Finals referee.
 Diana Johnson, Labour MP for Hull North
 Phil Leeson, 20th century development economist and Communist activist
 Dr Terence Melia CBE, Senior Chief Inspector, HMI 1991–92; Chief Inspector Further Education Funding Council 1992–96; Chairman Further Education Development Agency 1997–2000; Chairman of the Further Education National Training Organisation 2000–03; Chairman of the Learning and Skills Development Agency from 2000–03.
 Nathan Paget, 17th-century physician and Puritan activist
 Thomas Pierson, 17th-century conformist Puritan presbyter
 John Sharps, 20th-century Gaskell scholar
 Sir Brian Smith CBE, Freeman of the City of  London
 Richard Steele, 17th-century Presbyterian minister and Puritan writer, buried at Great St Bartholomew's)
 Stuart Thompson, 21st-century engineer on the Three Gorges Dam
 Robert Westall, 20th-century children's author and longstanding Head of Art at the school, wrote a short story entitled Sir John Deane's in 2010. In 2007, the manuscript was displayed at the Weaver Hall Museum, a few minutes' walk from the College.
 Percy Young, 20th-century writer and musicologist

See also
List of English and Welsh endowed schools (19th century)
Education in the United Kingdom

References and bibliography

External links

 
 Ofsted Report 2003
 Extracts from the Old Wittonian , 1904–07
 Photos of the 1907 building, including the war memorial

Ancient grammar schools of Cheshire
Educational institutions established in the 1550s
Higher education colleges in England
Northwich
Learning and Skills Beacons
Sixth form colleges in Cheshire
1557 establishments in England
Education in Cheshire West and Chester